Minatamis na saging (literally "sweetened banana") is a Filipino dessert made with chopped saba bananas cooked in a sweet syrup (arnibal) made with muscovado sugar and water. Some recipes also add a little bit of salt and pandan leaf or vanilla extract. Other ingredients can also be added like sweet potato, sago, or other fruits like jackfruit. It can be eaten on its own or added as an ingredient to other desserts (notably for halo-halo). Adding the dessert over milk and shaved ice also results in another dessert known as saba con yelo (also sabá con hielo in Spanish).

See also

 Ice buko
 Banana cue
 Ginanggang
 List of banana dishes
 Maruya
 Turon

References

Banana dishes
Philippine desserts
Snack foods